I Am Jesus is the sixth studio album by the Greek metal band Nightfall, released in 2003 by Black Lotus. The songs were mostly written and arranged by the bass guitarist/vocalist Efthimis Karadimas, with the exception of four songs, which were co-written with the guitarist Mike Galiatsos, who left the band during the time of their last album, Diva Futura (1999).

Track listing
All songs written By Efthimis Karadimas, except where noted.
 "Death of Neira" 4:32
 "The Senior Lover of Diamanda" 4:28
 "I Am Jesus" (Karadimas, Mike Galiatsos) 3:34
 "A Pale Crescendo of Diamond Suns" 3:38
 "Luciferin (What if Men Could Bear Masters?)" 6:02 
 "Muscat (Darkdark Road)" 3:30
 "The Poor Us" (Karadimas, Galiatsos) 3:06 
 "I’ve Never Dreamt the Life We Share" (Karadimas, Galiatsos) 5:14 
 "Treasures in Aramaic Tears (Echelon)" 5:49
 "Semana Tragica" (Karadimas, Galiatsos) 6:35
 "Nightfall" 5:39

Personnel
Efthimis Karadimas: bass guitar, vocals
George Bokos: lead and rhythm guitars
Bob Katsionis: lead and rhythm guitars
George Kollias: drums, percussion

External links
Metal Reviews
Metal Review

2003 albums
Nightfall (band) albums